John Russell was a Scottish footballer who played as a right half.

Career
Russell played club football for Cambuslang, and made one appearance for Scotland in 1890.

References

Year of birth missing
Place of birth missing
Scottish footballers
Scotland international footballers
Cambuslang F.C. players
Association football wing halves
Year of death missing
Place of death missing